The 2020 GT World Challenge America powered by AWS is the 14th season of the United States Auto Club's GT World Challenge America, the third season under ownership of the SRO Motorsports Group and the first season without Blancpain sponsorship. The season began on 7 March in Austin and will end on 4 October at Indianapolis.

Calendar
At the annual press conference during the 2019 24 Hours of Spa on 26 July, the Stéphane Ratel Organisation announced the first draft of the 2020 calendar with Las Vegas being dropped from the schedule in favor of Indianapolis. Austin was removed from the provisional calendar on 25 October, before it would return on 8 November after extensive discussions with team owners and stakeholders. The round at Indianapolis became a non-points paying event.
Calendar changes due to COVID-19 pandemic
The round at Canadian Tire Motorsport Park was cancelled. The round at Virginia was moved from 6–7 June to 11–12 July. The round at Indianapolis is back to being a points paying event to replace the cancelled rounds at CTMP with the first three hours of the Indianapolis 8 Hour Intercontinental GT race counting towards the championship.

Entry list
The Pro Cup class was eliminated from the series for this season.

Race results
Bold indicates overall winner.

Points system
Scoring system
Championship points are awarded for the first ten positions in each race. Entries are required to complete 75% of the winning car's race distance in order to be classified and earn points. Individual drivers are required to participate for a minimum of 40 minutes in order to earn championship points in any race.

Standard Points

Indianapolis Points

Drivers' championship

Teams' championship

Manufacturers' championship

Source:

See also
2020 GT World Challenge Europe
2020 GT World Challenge Europe Endurance Cup
2020 GT World Challenge Asia
2020 GT World Challenge Europe Sprint Cup

Notes

References

External links

GT World Challenge America